Cercophonius is a genus of six species of Australian scorpions, often termed wood scorpions, in the family Bothriuridae.

Species
Cercophonius granulosus Kraepelin, 1908
Cercophonius kershawi Glauert, 1930 - mallee wood scorpion
Cercophonius michaelseni Kraepelin, 1908
Cercophonius queenslandae Acosta, 1990
Cercophonius squama (Gervais, 1843) - wood scorpion, forest scorpion
Cercophonius sulcatus Kraepelin, 1908 - western wood scorpion

References

 

 
 
Scorpion genera
Scorpions of Australia